Corwin was a small town, now extinct, in Randolph Township, Tippecanoe County, in the U.S. state of Indiana.

History

Corwin was laid out by Cyrus Foltz in 1856 and consisted of seven lots near the rail line which ran south out of Lafayette.  The town never flourished, though, and was eclipsed by nearby Romney. Later maps sometimes cite the town as Corwin Station.

A post office was established at Corwin in 1854, but was discontinued in that same year.

As of 9/19/2016 - The old grain silo has been removed.  It appears on the Bing! map which is of an unknown date, however the Google map shows it has been demolished.

Geography 

Corwin is located at 40°15'5" North, 86°54'52" West (40.251426, -86.914397) at an elevation of approximately 740 feet.  It sits in Randolph Township half a mile west of the town of Romney and is on a north–south CSX rail line.

Even though the community is now extinct, it is still cited by the USGS.

References 

Former populated places in Tippecanoe County, Indiana
Former populated places in Indiana